John Terrence Healy (2 July 1921 – 30 April 2009) was an Australian rules footballer who played with Essendon in the Victorian Football League (VFL).

Notes

External links 

1921 births
2009 deaths
Australian rules footballers from Victoria (Australia)
Essendon Football Club players